IJsselmonde is a river island in the Netherlands, between the Nieuwe Maas, Noord and Oude Maas branches rivers of the Rhine-Meuse delta in the province of South Holland. The city of Rotterdam now occupies most of the northern part of the island and includes the eponymous former village of IJsselmonde, once a separate community. The island was once a rich agricultural region but is mostly suburbs today. Only the mid-south parts of the island have retained their agricultural character.

Boundaries 
IJsselmonde is separated by these waterways:

from the mainland on the north by the Nieuwe Maas
from the island of Putten on the west by the Oude Maas
from Hoeksche Waard on the south by the Oude Maas
from the island of Dordrecht on the southeast by the Oude Maas
from the Alblasserwaard mainland on the east by river Noord

Municipalities and regions 
IJsselmonde consists of the following six municipalities:

 Albrandswaard
 Barendrecht
 Hendrik-Ido-Ambacht
 Ridderkerk
 Rotterdam (southern part)
 Zwijndrecht

Albrandswaard, Barendrecht, Ridderkerk and Rotterdam belong to the region of Rijnmond, Hendrik-Ido-Ambacht and Zwijndrecht belong to the region of Zuid-Holland Zuid.

Zwijndrechtse Waard 

Originally the Zwijndrechtse Waard, on which the municipalities of Hendrik-Ido-Ambacht and Zwijndrecht and the village of Rijsoord (partially) lie, was a separate river island, the western branch of river Waal separating the two. However, as the Waal stretch has been closed off at both ends, the Waard is now generally considered to be part of IJsselmonde. The dammed western end of the Waal river is now popularly referred to as Waaltje ("little Waal").

References 

 
Islands of South Holland
Regions of South Holland
Regions of the Netherlands
Islands of the Rhine–Meuse–Scheldt delta